State Route 773 (SR 773) is a  state highway in Esmeralda County, Nevada, United States. Known as Fish Lake Valley Road, the highway was a part of former SR 3A.

Route description
SR 773 begins at a junction with State Route 264 north of Fish Lake Valley.

History

The highway originally composed the northern  of State Route 3A, a route christened in 1933 to connect State Route 15 (now US 6) to Fish Lake Valley and Dyer.  SR 3A was replaced by State Route 773 and State Route 264 on July 1, 1976.  SR 773 did not appear on state highway maps until 1991.

Major intersections
Mileposts on the highway are a continuation of State Route 264 mileposts.

References

773
Transportation in Esmeralda County, Nevada